The Fairbanks (Fairbank) family is a noted American and Canadian family of English origin. The family descends from colonist Jonathan Fairbanks, who emigrated to Boston, Massachusetts in 1633 with his family, settling at Dedham, Massachusetts three years later. There he built the Fairbanks House, today the oldest surviving verified timber-frame house in the United States.

The following genealogical tree illustrates the links between the more notable family members:

Family tree

 Jonathan Fairbanks (c. 1595–1668) m. Grace Smith (c. 1600–1673)
John Fairbanks I (1618–1684) m. Sarah Fiske (c. 1620–1683)
Joseph Fairbanks I (1656–1734) m. Dorcas ? (c. 1660–1738)
Joseph Fairbanks II (1687–1753) m. Abigail Deane (1694–1750)
Samuel Fairbanks (1728–1812) m. Mary Draper
Samuel Fairbanks (1753–1825) m. (1). Rachel Lovett (1755–1806); 1807 (2). Joanna Gilmer (d. 1812); 1812 (3). Martha Legg (d. 1838)
Jasan Fairbanks (1785–1875) m. Mary Massey (1796–1882)
George Rainsford Fairbanks (1820–1906)
George Fairbanks (1619–1682)
Eleazer Fairbanks (1655–1741) m. Martha Lovett
Eleazer Fairbanks (1690–1741) m. Martha Bullard
Eleazer Fairbanks (1716–1782) m. Prudence Cary
Abel Fairbanks (1754–1842) m. Hannah Hobbs (d. 1840)
Harvey Fairbanks (1787–1877) m. Lois Hall (1792–1872)
Charles Hall Fairbanks (1835–1916) m. Amelia A. Williams (1836–1926)
Herbert Charles Fairbanks (1859–1932) m. Ellen E. Hammond (1857–1920)
Frank Latta Fairbanks (1884–1939) m. Helen McClellan Hart
David Fairbanks (1922–1975)
Ebenezer Fairbanks (1734–1812) m. Elizabeth Dearth (1743–1818)
Joseph Fairbanks (1763–1846) m. Phebe Paddock (1760–1853)
Erastus Fairbanks (1792–1864) m. Lois Crossman (1792–1866)
Horace Fairbanks (1820–1888) m. Mary E. Taylor (1824–1901)
 Franklin Fairbanks (1828–1895)
 Thaddeus Fairbanks (1796–1886) m. Lucy Peck Barker (1798-1866)
Henry Fairbanks (1830–1918) m. 1862 (1). Annie S. Noyes (1845–1872); 1874 (2). Ruthy Page
Charlotte Fairbanks (1871–1932)
Rufus Fairbanks (1759–1842) m. Ann Prescott (1766–1850)
Charles Rufus Fairbanks (1790–1841)
Samuel Prescott Fairbanks (1795–1882)
 Jonathan Fairbanks (1662–1719) m. (1). Sarah ? (1666–1713)
Samuel Fairbanks (1693–1756) m. Susannah Watson
Samuel Fairbanks (1720–1790) m. (1). Hannah Corbin; (2). Lucy Smith (d. 1802)
Jonas Fairbanks (1747–1825) m. (1). Mary Carter; 1782. (2). Freelove Stanley (1760–1831)
Ebenezer Fairbanks (1776–1848) m. Abigail Cobb
Henry Fairbanks (1825–1909) m. Esther Palmer (1832–1910)
Charles Fairbanks (1857–1935) m. Sarah Palmer (1860–1954)
Louis Byron Fairbanks (1885–1961) m. Henrietta Herron
Charles H. Fairbanks (1913–1984)
Jonas Fairbanks (1625–1676) m. Lydia Prescott
Jabez Fairbank (c. 1670–1758) m. (1). Mary Wilder (c. 1675–1718)
Joseph Fairbank (1693–1772) m. Mary Brown (c. 1700–1791)
Joseph Fairbank (1722–1802) m. (1). Mary Willard (1722–1748); 1749 (2). Abigail Tarbell (1721–1798); 1801 (3). Mary Willard
Joseph Fairbank (1743–1784) m. Asenath Osgood 
Joseph Fairbank III (1778–1847) m. Polly Brooks (1780–1860)
David Fairbanks (1810–1895) m. Susan Mandeville (1819–1899)
Ralph Jacobus Fairbanks (1857–1943) m. Celestia Adelaide Johnson
Zella Modine (1900–1995)
Nola Fairbanks (1924–2021)
Mark Alexander Modine
Matthew Modine (b. 1959)
Ruby Modine (b. 1990)
 John Boylston Fairbanks (1817–1875) m. Sarah Van Wagoner
John Fairbanks (1855–1940) m. (1). Lilly Huish (1857–1898); 1917 (2). Florence Gifford
J. Leo Fairbanks (1878–1946)
Ortho Lane Fairbanks (b. 1887)
Ortho R. Fairbanks (1925–2015)
Avard Fairbanks (1897–1987)
Jonathan Leo Fairbanks (b. 1933)
Jonas Fairbank (1703–1792) m. Thankful Wheeler (1711–1795)
Josiah Fairbank (1734–1798) m. Abigail Carter (d. 1815)
Manesseh Fairbank (1765–1848) m. Octavia Taylor (1771–1866)
Stephen Taylor Fairbank (1794–1850) m. Mehitable Kellogg
Nathaniel Kellogg Fairbank (1829–1903) m. Helen Livingston Graham (1840–1895)
Kellogg Fairbank (1869–1939) m. Janet Ayer Fairbank (1878–1951)
Janet Fairbank (1903–1947)
Ephraim Fairbank (1770–1837) m. Sarah Chandler (1776–1844)
John Barnard Fairbank (1796–1873) m. Hannah M. Crissy
Rev. Samuel B. Fairbank (1822–1898) m. 1846 Abby Allen (d. 1852); 1856 (2). Mary Ballantine (1836–1878)
Rev. Henry Fairbank (1862–1926) m. Ruby Elizabeth Harding (1860–1906)
Samuel Ballantine Fairbank (1887–1959) m. Helen Leslie Martin 
William M. Fairbank (1917–1989) m. Jane Davenport
Richard Fairbank (b. 1950)
Rev. John Barnard Fairbank (1831–1910) m. 1859 (1). Emily P. Mack (d. 1860); 1863 (2). Ruth A. Boyce (d. 1889)
Arthur Boyce Fairbank (1873–1936) m. Lorena King (1874–1979)
John K. Fairbank (1907–1991)
Thomas Fairbank (1707–1791) m. Dorothy Carter (1710–1784)
John Fairbank (1731–1817) m. (1). Relief Houghton; 1796 (2). Tabitha White
John Fairbank (1755–1830) m. Fanny Kelton (d. 1847)
Asa Fairbank (1784–1842) m. 1827 (1). Polly Leonard (d. 1827); 1829 (2). Mary Oliver (d. 1870)
John Henry Fairbank (1831–1914) m. Edna Chrysler (1829–1896)
Charles Oliver Fairbank (1858–1925) m. Clara Mabel Sussex 
Charles Oliver Fairbank (1904–1982)
Joshua Fairbank (1714–1769) m. Eunice Wilder
Calvin Fairbank (1753–1836) m. (1). Jenny Ayers (1755–1803)
Chester Fairbank (1788–1849) m. Betsey Abbott (1787–1882)
Calvin Fairbank (1816–1898)
Luther Fairbank (1755–1836) m. 1777 (1). Thankful Wheelock (1757–1820); (2). Anna ? (d. 1842)
Luther Fairbank (1780–1857) m. (1). Lucy Lewis (1785–1842); 1849 (2). Miranda McLenathan (d. 1850)
Loriston Monroe Fairbanks (1824–1900) m. Mary A. Smith
Charles W. Fairbanks (1852–1918) m. Cornelia Cole Fairbanks (1852–1913)
Richard Monroe Fairbanks (1884–1944) m. Louise Hibben (1889–1912)
Richard Monroe ("Dick") Fairbanks (1912–2000) m. (1). Mary Caperton (d. 1967); 1968 (2). Virginia Nicholson Brown (d. 2007)
Richard M. Fairbanks III (1941–2013)

References

 
American families of English ancestry
Families from Massachusetts
Political families of the United States